was a town located in Nakatado District, Kagawa Prefecture, Japan.

As of 2003, the town had an estimated population of 3,056 and a density of 36.91 persons per km². The total area was 82.79 km².

On March 20, 2006, Kotonami, along with the town of Chūnan (also from Nakatado District), was merged into the expanded town of Mannō.

Geography 
Kotonami is located in the center of the northern face of the Sanuki Mountains which span across the southern part of Kagawa Prefecture. A class A river called the Doki River flows north to south through the center of town.
 Mountains: Mount Ryuno, Mount Daisen, Mount Kasagata, Mount Shiroyama
 Ponds: Bichuji Pond
 Rivers: Doki River

History 
 September 29th, 1956 (Shōwa year 31) - Miai in Ayauta District was merged with Sōda to create Kotonami.
 November 1st, 1957 (Shōwa year 32) - Kotonami became a part of Nakatado District due to border modifications.
 April 1st, 1962 (Shōwa year 37) - Kotonami was converted from a village into a town.
 March 20th, 2006 (Heisei year 18) - Kotonami and Chūnan merged to create Mannō, eliminating Kotonami.

External links
Official website

Dissolved municipalities of Kagawa Prefecture
Mannō, Kagawa